"I'm Ready" is a song by British singer Sam Smith and American singer Demi Lovato, released through Capitol Records on 16 April 2020. Smith and Lovato co-wrote "I'm Ready" with Savan Kotecha, Peter Svensson, and the song's producer, Ilya Salmanzadeh. It reached the top 20 in Ireland, the Netherlands, Scotland, and the United Kingdom as well as the top 30 in Australia, Canada, Croatia, Lithuania, New Zealand, and Singapore. The song appears on Smith's third studio album Love Goes (2020) and on the expanded edition of Lovato's seventh studio album Dancing with the Devil... the Art of Starting Over.

Background and release
In an interview, Smith shared that they "grew up listening to" and "singing" Lovato's music, calling them an "incredible talent" and "everything [they stand] for as a human being". Thus, they revealed that they had been "training" for the moment to collaborate with Lovato for a long time. Smith also said that they had already been in contact as a friend to Lovato for years, and Lovato was invited to the studio by their mutual songwriter Savan Kotecha, which is what led to the collaboration happening.

On 9 April, Smith shared a polaroid of Smith and Lovato in the studio, captioned with "S + D 4 EVA". Smith also teased the duet on social media, tweeting "YOU READY" and tagging Lovato with a GIF that displays Smith and Lovato's initials; Lovato responded with "I'M READY". On 13 April, Smith and Lovato announced the title of the duet and its release date. During an interview with Popbuzz, Smith confirmed that "I'm Ready" was being released in promotion of their upcoming third album but might not appear on the final track listing.

Composition
Described by Smith as "2020 ABBA", "I'm Ready" is considered a pop song with disco  elements. The song features an "edgy" production and gospel choirs, with dark "sultry" verses and a "bass-y" chorus. Moreover, the song incorporates a fun, synth-pop flair with dynamic vocals. Lyrically, the duet is a "feel-good love song" about "having the bravery to be vulnerable and accepting of love" and strives to be an "anthemic musical declaration that both artists are ready to find love and, more importantly, to be loved by someone who appreciates them."

Critical reception
"I'm Ready" received generally positive reviews from music critics. Raisa Bruner of Time deemed "I'm Ready" a "blazing new power anthem duet" and praised the "emotional showcase" of the two vocalists, saying that both "Smith and Lovato are on their game here". She also found that the elements of the song, including "an uplifting gospel chorus and a juicy bass section", makes for a "summer pop mash-up". Juddah Charles Lotter of MEAWW praised both the song and music video, saying "Sam Smith and Demi Lovato create magic in [the]  Olympic-inspired beautifully infectious video". Lotter was particularly impressed by the vocal display in the last scene of the music video: "The final scene shows Lovato and Smith side-by-side atop a podium with some gymnasts performing nearby in a medal ceremony and the two belt out a rich simultaneous vocal performance with a choir providing the backing vocals". He went on to say that both Smith and Lovato "use their vocal gymnastics gorgeously with pitch-perfect singing and it almost feels like they kept fans waiting on the collab long enough just to see them burst into Olympic torch flame with excitement when they finally got the chance to hear it", as "they sound utterly amazing together".

Music video

Background and release 
The music video was released on 17 April 2020. It was directed by Jora Frantzis, best known for her work on the 2019 music video for Cardi B's "Money". Smith shared in an interview with The Hot Press that queer inclusivity was a main factor when creating the setting and concept behind the music video: Smith recalls how they grew up queer and experiencing bullying in "the locker room with boys" at school, and thus being incessantly "scared of" and "triggered" by sports. Smith goes on to share that being able to have a "queer Olympics" in the music video was an "amazing" and "exciting" experience, and that it bought them joy, as they enjoyed "learning to wrestle in stilettos".

In the behind-the-scenes video released on 7 May 2020, director Jora Frantzis describes her thought process regarding the creation of the music video: she says "when I hear music that's as powerful and as big as this song is, I automatically envision motion and energy". As such, she wanted to do something that was "sports-related" but still tie it back to "what Smith represents", as Sam noted that for "the gay community, sports was always kind of a traumatizing experience in high school". She noted that "Sam thought it would be very empowering to kinda take over high school sports in the way that we did, almost like taking the power back." At the end of shooting the music video, Smith proclaimed to Lovato "I think we've actually made the gayest video of all time," to which Lovato laughed and agreed with a cheerful "Yes!"

Prior to the video's release, Smith and Lovato hopped on a video chat to reminisce about writing the song together. During this video chat, Smith and Lovato joked that the "I'm Ready" video is the "Queer Olympics" the world needs right now. "There was so much love in that place and so many beautiful people," Smith said about the video shoot, with Lovato agreeing, "Yes, beautiful people that were so talented."

Synopsis
The music video opens on Smith circling a man on the wrestling mat, as they sing about "waiting patiently for a beautiful lover" and vowing to "take that risk tonight" with someone new. As the instrumental approaches the bridge of the song, Smith lines up for a 100-meter sprint—they and their equally glam competitors dash off in sky-high stilettos, voluminous skirts, and impeccably applied makeup. These competitors include queer artists and drag queens Valentina, Gigi Goode, Dee TrannyBear, Alok Vaid-Menon, Shea Diamond and Jeffrey C. Williams.

The second verse of the song is taken over by Lovato; they hold court on a tall diving board, rocking a sophisticated black suit and appearing androgynous in style and mannerisms, as a queer all-male synchronized swim team near them on the diving board dive into the pool below them. Later on, Smith dances in high heels in their wrestling suit with their competitor wrestlers dancing alongside them. The choreography was coordinated by choreographer Sean Bankhead. Lovato and Smith eventually come together for the song's climax, which takes them to a gymnast-filled medal ceremony.

Critical reception 
The Hot Press says that the music video "sees the cast redefine sports in beautiful, artistic, unapologetically queer ways." The way in which the "wrestlers and swimmers don sparkling, glittery outfits, corsets and sky-high stilettos", as well as the flow of the music video, in which "wrestling turns into dancing" and running "into a rainbow display", were elements that were particularly noted as impressive and empowering. Rory Gory and Shane Michael Singh from The Trevor Project applauded Smith for their dedication toward promoting and celebrating the LGBTQ community: "We actually have LGBTQ people behind the scenes, in front of the camera, creating the content themselves. That's when it feels really authentic and real," Gory said.

Credits and personnel

Song
Credits adapted from Tidal.

 Sam Smith – songwriting, vocals, backing vocals
 Demi Lovato – songwriting, vocals
 Ilya – production, songwriting, bass guitar, drums, guitar, keyboards, percussion, programming
 Peter Svensson – songwriting
 Savan Kotecha – songwriting
 Wojtek Goral – alto saxophone
 David Bukovinszky – cello
 Johan Carlsson – piano
 Mattias Bylund – strings, string arrangement, choir arrangement, engineering
 Tomas Jonsson – tenor saxophone
 Peter Noos Johansson – trombone
 Janne Bjerger – trumpet
 Magnus Johansson – trumpet
 Anneli Axon – background vocals
 Johanna S Jonasson – background vocals
 Anna Bylund – background vocals
 Mattias Johansson – violin
 John Hanes – engineering, studio personnel
 Sam Holland – engineering, studio personnel
 Serban Ghenea – mixing, studio personnel
 Randy Merrill – mastering, studio personnel

Music video
Credits adapted from YouTube.

 Jora Frantzis – director
 PRETTYBIRD – producer
 Kevin Kloecker – video commissioner
 Candice Dragonas –  VP / executive producer 
 Chris Clavadetscher – executive producer 
 Rob Witt – director of photography 
 Sean Bankhead – choreographer 
 Rika Osenberg – head of production 
 Autumn Hymes – line producer 
 Kenia Gutierrez – production supervisor 
 Adam Winder – stylist (Sam Smith)
 Sienree Du – hair and makeup (Sam Smith)
 Siena Montesano – stylist (Demi Lovato)
 Paul Norton – hair (Demi Lovato)
 Rokael Lizama – makeup (Demi Lovato)

Charts

Certifications

Release history

References

2020 singles
2020 songs
Sam Smith (singer) songs
Demi Lovato songs
Songs written by Sam Smith (singer)
Songs written by Demi Lovato
British pop songs
American pop songs
Songs written by Ilya Salmanzadeh
Songs written by Savan Kotecha
Songs written by Peter Svensson
Song recordings produced by Ilya Salmanzadeh
American dance-pop songs
British dance-pop songs
Impact of the COVID-19 pandemic on the music industry